is a video game producer.  He was the former head of Love Plus Production, a video game develop team under Konami, best known as the producer of LovePlus series, a dating sim video game series that player can date with 3 different high school girls. He joined Konami in 1993 and left in March 2015 and will join another Japan video game company, Yuke's officially in October 2015; additionally he will lead a new game development team—Uchida Lab, named by his name.  He has received the nickname "father-in-law"(お義父さん) by LovePlus fans.

Works

Konami era 
 Ganbare Goemon: Uchū Kaizoku Akogingu (1996) - Programmer
 Nagano Winter Olympics '98 (1998) - Game Designer
 Dance Dance Revolution (1999) - Programmer

Tokimeki Memorial Girl's Side series
 Tokimeki Memorial Girl's Side (2002) - Game Designer, Scriptwriter, Director
 Tokimeki Memorial Girl's Side: 2nd Kiss (2006) - Game Designer, Scenario Supervisor, Producer
 Tokimeki Memorial Girl's Side: 1st Love (2007)
 Tokimeki Memorial Girl's Side: 2nd Season (2008) - Producer 
 Tokimeki Memorial Girl's Side: 1st Love Plus (2009) - Producer 
 Tokimeki Memorial Girl's Side: 3rd Story (2010) - Planning, Scenario, Producer 
 Tokimeki Memorial Girl's Side Premium 〜3rd Story〜 (2012)Rumble Roses series
 Rumble Roses (2004) - Producer
 Rumble Roses XX (2006) - ProducerMagician's Quest series
 Magician's Quest: Mysterious Times (2008)
 Tongariboushi to Mahou no o mise (2010)
 Tongariboushi to osharena mahotsukai (2011)
 Tongariboushi tomahō no machi (2012)LovePlus series
 LovePlus (2009) - Producer, Scenario
 LovePlus + (2010) - Producer, Scenario
 NEW LovePlus (2012) - Senior Producer, Scenario
 LovePlus Collection (2013)
 NEW LovePlus +'' (2012) - Senior Producer, Scenario

References

External links 
  Akari Uchida on Twitter

1969 births
Living people
Japanese video game producers
Konami people